Sourgou is a town in the Sourgou Department of Boulkiemdé Province in central western Burkina Faso. It is the capital of the Sourgou Department and has a population of 2,211.

References

External links
Satellite map at Maplandia.com

Populated places in Boulkiemdé Province